Liu Taigong, personal name Liu Tuan, was the father of Liu Bang (Emperor Gaozu of Han).

Biography
Not much is recorded about Taigong historically. He was born and likely lived his early life in present-day Feng County, Jiangsu. His personal name is not known. Some historical sources says his name is Liu Zhijia (Chinese:劉執嘉), although this name is likely chosen after Liu Bang became Emperor. He likely came from a humble, rural background.

After Taigong's son Liu Bang became emperor, Liu Bang continued to visit his father once a week. However, upon hearing from an advisor that it was no longer appropriate for Taigong to "receive" his son, as Taigong was technically one of his subjects, Taigong began to greet his son in deprecatory fashion, honoring the latter's status as emperor. Upon learning the reason behind his father's actions, Liu Bang honored Taigong with the title Taishang Huang on 4 July 201 BCE, a year after Liu Bang declared himself emperor in February 202 BCE. The title nominally elevated Liu's status in court protocol as to remain consistent with Confucian norms of filial piety. 

Taigong died at a palace in the city of Yueyang in June 197 BC. On 9 August 197 BC, he was entombed in present-day Lintong District, Xi'an.

Family
Consorts and Issue:
 Wang Hanshi, also known as Liu Ao ("Old woman Liu"), posthumously honored as Empress Zhaoling
 Liu Bo, Prince Wu'ai (b. 262 BC), first son
 Liu Xi, Prince Qing of Wu (260–193 BC), second son
 Empress Zhao'ai
 Liu Bang, Emperor Gao (256–195 BC), third son
 Retired Empress, of the Li clan, formerly a concubine
 Liu Jiao, Prince Yuan of Chu (d. 179 BC), fourth son

Ancestry

References

Zizhi Tongjian, volumes 9 to 12
Records of the Grand Historian, volume 8
Book of Han, volume 36

3rd-century BC births
197 BC deaths
Emperor Gaozu of Han